Narcís Sayrach i Fatjó dels Xiprers (Barcelona 1931-)  is a Catalan historian, cultural promoter and civic activist. In 2003 he received the Creu de Sant Jordi  "for his sustained contribution to the recovery of Catalonia from a social, cultural and linguistic points of view paying special attention to the most disadvantaged sectors". And, uniquely, for his outstanding work transmitting  the figure of Saint George through various publications and initiatives such as the association of Amics de Sant Jordi, of which he is president. His personal collection, made by diverse graphical artwork referred to the figure of “ Sant Jordi” is preserved in Biblioteca de Catalunya.

Published books

References

External links 
 Fons Narcís Sayrach de la Biblioteca de Catalunya.

1931 births
Historians from Catalonia
Living people